Dauge and Daugé are French surnames. Notable people with these surnames include:
August Dauge, consul for the Belgian concession of Tianjin
Catherine Daugé (born 1956), French Olympic gymnast
Enoch Dauge (died 1842), American owner of Dozier Farm in Tennessee
 (1829–1899), Belgian mathematician and politician
 (1918–2016), French diplomat, president of French Red Cross
Lucas Dauge, French cyclist for Team Novo Nordisk
Maurice Daugé, French competitor in Golf at the Inter-Allied Games
Monique Dauge (born 1956), French mathematician
Pauls Dauge (1869–1946), Latvian dentist and revolutionary
Peter Dauge, American revolutionary officer in Wilmington District Brigade
Valérie Dauge, French politician in Departmental Council of Vienne
 (1907–1944), Belgian Trotskyist politician
Yves Dauge (born 1935), French politician

See also
Daegu, city in South Korea
Daugai, city in Lithuania

French-language surnames